Clan MacAlister is a Scottish Clan. The clan is the earliest branch to have split off from Clan Donald, claiming descent from Alasdair Mòr, son of Domhnall founder of Clan Donald. From Alasdair Mòr the clans takes its surname MacAlister; this surname is an Anglicisation of the Gaelic MacAlasdair meaning "son of Alasdair". In the 15th century the chief of the clan was seated in Kintyre, and the clan was centred there until the 18th century, when a chief sold the family estate in preference to an estate in the Scottish Lowlands.

History of the clan

Origins

Clan MacAlister was originally a branch of Clan Donald—one of the largest Scottish clans. The eponymous ancestor of Clan Donald is Domhnall, son of Raghnall, son of Somhairle. Traditional Clan Donald genealogies, created in the later Middle Ages, give the clan a descent from various legendary Irish figures. Modern historians, however, distrust these traditional genealogies, and consider Somhairle, son of Gille Brighde to be earliest ancestor for whom there is secure historical evidence. Somhairle, himself, was a 12th-century leader, styled "king of the isles" and "king of Argyll"; yet there is no reliable account for his rise to power.

Confusion and the clan's founder

Today, Clan MacAlister claims to descend from Alasdair Mòr, son of Domhnall, founder of Clan Donald. There has, however, been confusion as to who really was the clan's founder. This is because within a generation there lived two prominent Alasdairs (an uncle and nephew). Both of these men left many sons, however, their immediate posterity are not clearly connected with definite area. The lack of charter evidence clouds the true history of the clan; as does the fact that for about two hundred years, the descendants of both men did not form an organised clan of their own.

Alasdair Mòr first appears on record in 1253, when is recorded as witnessing a charter by his brother, Aonghas Mór a Íle, to the Paisley Abbey. According to Angus and Archibald Macdonald, he must have been a prominent man, being the only recorded brother of the Aonghas Mór. A. and A. Macdonald state that he was recorded in the Irish Annals, in 1299, as being a man noted for "hospitality and excellence". In that year he was slain in a conflict with Alasdair of Argyll and the MacDougalls. According to the traditional shanachies, Alasdair Mòr had at least five sons: Domhnall, Gofraidh, Donnchadh, Eoin and Eachann. He was succeeded by Domhnall.

Younger sons of Alasdair Mòr

Sometime in the early 14th century, descendants of Alasdair Mòr seem to have settled in the county of Stirling. The first such descendant of whom there is any record is Gilbert, son of Domhnall, who received a charter for unspecified lands in the region, in the year 1330. This man appears to be same as the Gilbert de Insula who received a charter for the lands of Glorat in the parish of Campsie. Today, Gilbert de Insula is considered to be a grandson of Alasdair Mòr. He is also considered to possibly be the ancestor the Alexanders of Menstrie, earls of Stirling from 1633. Little is known about the descendants of Gofraidh, second son of Alasdair Mòr. According to the MS 1467, he had a son, Somhairle, who had a son, Gilbert. A. and A. Macdonald could not find any other definite piece of information about the descendants of Gofraidh. According to A. and A. Macdonald, Donnchadh, third son of Alasdair Mòr, possessed lands in the parish of Glenorchy. In about 1343, David II granted to Alexander MacNaughtane, all the lands which had belonged to the deceased Eoin, son of Donnchadh, son of Alasdair. A. and A. Macdonald were unable to find any other record of this branch of the clan. Nothing is known about Eoin, son of Alasdair Mòr. According to the MS 1467, Eachann, youngest son of Alasdair Mòr, had two sons, Charles and Lachlann. Nothing definite is known of Eachann, yet the Sleat seanachie McVurich claimed that he had another son, Siothach an Dronan, who settled in Ireland and founded Clan Sheehy (MacSithigh) of Munster. This clan is recorded in 1552, as fighting in army of O'Neill, and described as gallowglass. The Irish Annals, however, describe them as belonging to the province of Leinster. McVurich also claimed that Clan Domhnuill Renna and MacWilliam of the province of Connacht were also descended from Alasdair Mòr.

Successors of Alasdair Mòr

Domhnall, son of Alasdair Mòr, swore fealty to Edward I of England in 1291. He was succeeded by his own son, Alasdair. Alasdair was also recorded as swearing fealty to the English king at the same time as his father. He was in turn succeeded by his son, Raghnall, who in 1366 crossed over into Ulster to fight in the wars between Donald and Neill O'Neill. A. and A. Macdonald considered the succession of the next three MacAlister chiefs to have been obscure. The two historians stated that Raghnall was succeeded by Alasdair who flourished about the year 1400. Alasdair was succeeded by Eoin Dubh from whom the modern chiefs derive their Gaelic designation Mac Iain Duibh. A. and A. Macdonald stated that this patronymic has caused confusion since the eldest son of Alasdair Og, the forfeited Hebridean magnate, was also named Eoin Dubh; and that his descendants were called Clann Eoin Duibh.

15th century

Eoin Dubh was succeeded by Charles. In 1481, James III granted a considerable amount of land in Kintyre to John, Lord of the Isles. Among these lands were those of "Lowb", or Loup. That year, Charles McAllister was appointed by the king, to the Stewarty of Kintyre, and received a considerable grant of lands in that area. The Stewartry of Kintyre was a life appointment, and the lands consisted of 40 merklands. The lands were as follows: 4 merklands of Machquarrymore of Dunaverty, 2 merklands of the two Ramcollis, 2 merklands of Edyne, 1 merkland of Knockstippilmore, 1 merkland of Keranbeg, 2 merklands of Glennomudlach, 5 merks of Kildovy, 5 merklands of Polmulyn, 1 merkland of Salkanch, 3 merklands of Glennahervy, 2 merklands of Feachaig, 20 shillings lands of Corpany, the half merkland of Barfarnay, 2 merklands of Kilmichell, 4 merklands of de la Crag, to be held in fen farm. These lands were situated in North and South Kintyre. There is no mention of Loup and A. Macdonald stated that the lands were probably already in his possession, and had likely been in his family's possession for quite some time.

16th century

Charles was succeeded in the representation of the clan by his son, John. A. and A. Macdonald state that the only record of the existence of John is of his son's patronym Angus John Dowson of Loup. Angus is recorded among other Argyll chieftains whom protection was given by the Duke of Albany in 1515. The chieftains were described as "familiars and servitors" of Colin, Earl of Argyll. Angus John Dowson was succeeded by Alexander MacAlister. This chief was involved, among the Macleans and Clan Donald South, in the invasion of the Campbell territories of Rosneath, Lennox, and Craignish, in 1529. He was later denounced as a rebel for his failure to find security for his future good behaviour.

In the 15th and 16th centuries, members of the clan obtained lands in the islands of Arran and Bute, which lie close to Kintyre. In 1506, Donald MacAlister received a grant of the lands of Longilwenach, and according to A. and A. Macdonald, his descendants became quite numerous in the said islands. Despite the fact the chiefs of Clan MacAlister never possessed lands in Buteshire, the connection of several of their clansmen to that area brought the chiefs trouble.

A. and A. Macdonald state that during the remainder of the 16th century, the clan sought the protection under the more powerful Macdonalds of Dunyveg, and the powerful lords Argyll and Hamilton. Following the forfeiture of the lordship of the isles in 1493, the clan especially sheltered itself under the Macdonalds of Dunyveg. Between 1540 and 1572, the clan appears to have turned its attention to the turbulent north of Ireland. During this era men from the Hebrides often fought in Ulster on the side of Sorley Boy MacDonnell and according to A. and A. Macdonald, there is reason to believe that Clan MacAlister gave him some of his most strenuous support. A. and A. Macdonald stated that, sometime around 1571–1572, a body of Highlanders were defeated by Cheston who was captain of the English forces. One of those recorded as slain was one "Owen Mc Owen duffe Mc Alastrain, called the Lord of Loop". A. and A. Macdonald were of the opinion that this man was the son of Alexander MacAlister of Loup. The chief, John, was slain in 1572 and was succeeded in the chiefship by his son, Alexander. The following year, Alexander is recorded as receiving a charter from the Earl of Argyll; and around the same time was recorded as being ordered by an Act of Parliament to deliver hostages for the security of his peaceable behaviour.

In 1587, Alexander MacAlister of Loup was recorded in the General Band of 1587, in which Highland chiefs were held accountable by the Government for their tenants. In 1590, the clan rendered a bond of dependence and service to Lord John Hamilton; shortly afterwards a similar bond was given by the Tutor of Loup and clan members also Lord John Hamilton. A. and A. Macdonald state that Clan MacAlister was in no way dependent on the Hamiltons in Kintyre, yet those MacAlisters that settled in Arran and Bute had done so in the lands where the Hamiltons were lords. In 1591, Godfrey MacAlister of Loup received a charter from the Earl of Argyll.

In 1598, a serious quarrel broke out between Godfrey MacAlister of Loup, who had just reached the age of majority, and his former tutor and guardian. It is unknown what the reasons for the quarrel were, yet what is known is that MacAlister of Loup had the former tutor murdered. The sons of the murdered man then fled to Askomull House which was the Kintyre residence of Angus Macdonald of Dunyvaig. The historians A. and A. Macdonald stated that Macdonald of Dunyvaig was the tutor's sons' clan superior. MacAlister of Loup was however aided by Sir James Macdonald, younger of Dunyvaig and surrounded the house with several hundred armed men.

17th century

In 1603, Campbell of Auchinbreck and Archibald MacAlister, heir apparent of MacAlister of Tarbert, took part in an invasion of Bute. The force consisted of 1200 men and when it arrived on the island, first ravaged the property of a widow named Marion Stewart, and her lands of Wester Kames. The raiders then moved onto the lands of Ninian Stewart, Sheriff of Bute, committing similar atrocities. In consequence of the raid, the leaders were summoned to appear before the Council, yet failed to appear and were ordered to be denounced as rebels. In 1605, the Privy Council ordered Archibald MacAlister of Loups and John MacAlister, tutor of Loup to appear and produce evidence of their infeftments and rentals, under the pain of having their titles declared void. A. and A. Macdonald state that MacAlister of Loup was one of the few to attend and that he got titles from Argyll for his lands that year.

In 1614, Alexander was supposed to have supported his feudal superior, Argyll, in the capture of Dunyveg Castle. However, when he arrived on the scene he sided with the leader of the insurgents, Angus Og Macdonald. Because of his support of the rebels he was also punished. At his trial he was found guilty of treason and hung. The years between 1614 and 1623 were uneventful for the leading family of the clan. In 1623, a bond of caution was signed on the behalf of Godfrey MacAlister of Tarbet, pledging that he would not molest the family and followers of Archibald Stewart of Castlemilk, John Shaw of Greenock, Ferlie of that Ilk, John Crawford of Kilbirnie, John Brenshaw of Bishoptown, and James Crawford of Flatterton. For some time, Godfrey, who was son of the chief of MacAlister of Tarbet, raided the lands of the mentioned Lowland landowners. He is also recorded the same year as having to find caution for himself and Ronald Roy MacAlister for 3000 and 500 merks not to molest the following landowners and their families: Walter MacAulay of Ardincaple, Malcolm MacNaughtane of Stronseir, Robert Colhoun, fiar of Cumstrodone, and Dougal Campbell in Mamoir. A. and A. Macdonald made note of a serious quarrel between Godfrey MacAlister of Tarbet and Walter MacAulay of Ardincaple, chief of Clan MacAulay. Both Tarbert and Ardincaple claimed to be depute to the Admiral of the Western Seas; and the two Macdonald considered that Ardincaple had been ousted in favour of Tarbert. In 1623, a bond of caution was registered by Hector MacNeill of Kilmichell and John Lamont of Achagyll of 3,000 merks for Godrey MacAlister of Tarbert, and of 1,000 merks each for another four of his followers, not to molest Walter MacAulay of Ardincaple and his family. A. and A. Macdonald unsure of the outcome of this particular quarrel, stating: "As often happens regarding Highland quarrels and delinquencies, the records leave us enquiring wonderingly, and failing to answer the question, how this matter was settled, if it was settled at all".

In 1631, Archibald MacAlister of Tarbet visited William Alexander, 1st Earl of Stirling and acknowledged him as his chief. This was despite the fact the MacAlisters of Loup are today considered the chiefs of the clan. In 1689, a French ship which had sailed from Ireland reached Kintyre and was taken by MacAlister of Loup and Angus Campbell of Kilberry. The two lairds put the ship under guard and wrote to Argyll, who was attending the Convention of the Estates, asking for instructions as to what to do with it. According to A. and A. Macdonald, there is evidence to suggest that members of Clan MacAlister, possibly under their chief, took part in the Battle of Killiecrankie.

18th century to present

In the years spanning from 1689 and 1704 there is little to no record of the clan. However, in the year 1704, during the first parliament of Queen Anne, Alexander MacAlister of Loup and Archibald MacAlister of Tarbert are recorded as Commissioners of Supply for Argyll. By 1706, Tarbert had ceased to be a part of the family of the MacAlisters of Tarbert, as the estate into the possession of a Maclean. Alexander MacAlister of Loup was succeeded by his son, Godfrey, who was in turn succeeded by his son. During this period, the chiefly line of the clan severed all ties with Kintyre; the family mansion of Ardpatrick House was sold to Walter Campbell of Islay, after which Loup also passed out of the hands of the chiefly family.

Charles, 12th of Loup married the daughter and heiress of William Somerville of Kennox in 1792. In consequence, he assumed the name and arms of Somerville along with his own and the seat of the family was since then located in the Scottish Lowlands at Kennox, in Ayrshire. He died in 1847 and was succeeded by his son, Charles. Charles was succeeded by his son, Charles. Charles Somerville McAlester of Loup and Kennox died in 1903 and was succeeded by his son, Charles Godfrey Somerville McAlester of Loup and Kennox. Today the chiefly line has also lost possession of their Kennox lands. The current chief of the clan is William St John Somerville McAlester of Loup and Kennox who lives in England. The current chief is a member of the Standing Council of Scottish Chiefs. Today there is a clan centre located at Glenbarr Abbey.

Clan profile

Clan chief: The current chief of the clan is William St John Somerville McAlester of Loup and Kennox, Chief of the Name and Arms of MacAlister. The chief was recognised as such by the Lord Lyon King of Arms, in 1991. The Gaelic designation of the chiefs of Clan MacAlister is Mac Iain Duibh in reference to Eoin Dubh, from whom the MacAlisters of Loup claim to descend.
Chiefly arms: The current chief's coat of arms is blazoned: Or, an eagle displayed gules armed sable surmounted on the breast of a galley of the first within a bordure of the third charged with three cross crosslets fitchée argent. The supporters: (on a compartment entwined with an escrol bearing the second motto) dexter, a bear pierced in the back with an arrow all proper; sinister, an eagle proper. The motto: fortiter; and on the compartment: per mare per terras. The mottoes translate from Latin as "boldly" and "by sea and land". The crest: a dexter arm in armour erect, the hand holding a dagger in pale all proper.
Clan member's crest badge: The crest badge suitable for members of the clan contains the chief's heraldic crest and motto. Motto: fortiter. Crest: a dexter arm in armour erect, the hand holding a dagger in pale all proper.
Clan badge: According to Robert Bain, the plant badge of the clan is heath.
Tartan: There are several tartans attributed to the surname MacAlister. Contemporary accounts of Flora Macdonald suggest that the MacAlisters wore the Macdonald tartan at that time. The tartan pictured right dates from the 19th century and was approved as a clan tartan by the chief in 1845. Another approved tartan is the 'MacAlister dress' tartan. It is a modern tartan that was approved by the clan chief in 2005. It is also the official tartan of the MacAlister Clan Society of North America.
Branches of the clan: The principal cadet of the MacAlisters of Loup were the MacAlisters of Tarbet. Several members from this branch were for a time, constables of Tarbert Castle on Loch Fyne. Another branch of the clan are the MacAlisters of Glenbarr, who trace their descent from Eoin Dubh.

McAlister Genealogy Resources
Clan McAlister of America (CMA) is a non-profit organization whose mission is searching for, preserving, and sharing McAlister (of whatever spelling) genealogy and history from around the world. The public website (and member-only document repository) currently identifies over 350 historical McAlister Family Lines covering over 100,000 individuals. CMA also collaborates with FamilyTreeDNA in a robust “McAlister DNA Project,” viewable on the CMA web site, using Y-DNA, mitochondrial DNA, and autosomal DNA to identify familial connections.

References

Sources

External links
Clan McAlister of America Web Site
Clan MacAlister Society Web Site
Image: Descendants of John MacAlister b.1699 – d.1782

 
MacAlister
Gaelic families of Norse descent